Ganghwa Island (Hangul ; Hanja ), also known by its native name Ganghwado, is a South Korean island in the estuary of the Han River. It is in the Yellow Sea, off Korea's west coast. The island is separated from Gimpo (on the South Korean mainland) by a narrow channel spanned by two bridges, and from Kaesong (Gaeseong) in North Korea by the main channel of the Han River. North Korea can be seen on clear days from less than two kilometers away on South Korea's Ganghwa Island allowing better views of North Korean villages than from elsewhere in South Korea.

It is strategically located, controlling access to the river which runs through former Joseon and the present South Korean capital Seoul. Its fortifications were repeatedly attacked during the 19th century. The island has a population of about 65,500, half of whom live in Ganghwa Town (Ganghwa-eup) in the northeast.

Name
"Ganghwado" or "Ganghwa-do" (formerly ) means "island made prosperous", "illustrious" or "flourishing by the river" (in reference to its formation from the silt carried downriver by the Han River). Former romanizations include "Kang-hoa"  and "Kang-hwa".

Geography
The island is in the estuary of Korea's Han River. The island's highest point is Mani-san ( above sea level).

Climate

History

With the primary fortifications protecting the Joseon capital of Seoul from foreign invasion, Ganghwa Island was the site of several 19th-century punitive expeditions. The mass execution of Catholic French missionaries and Korean converts under the ministry of the Heungseon Daewongun in the mid-1860s led to a French invasion in 1866 which held the island for several weeks, although the inability of Admiral Pierre-Gustave Roze to sail up the shallow, uncharted Han River and attack its fortified monasteries prevented overland incursion. In 1871, a Korean assault on an American diplomatic mission led to the Battle of Ganghwa. Rear Admiral Rodgers took five forts on the island, but withdrew after the Koreans refused to negotiate. After an 1868 diplomatic incident related to Korea's refusal to recognize the imperial status of the emperor of Japan, the forts at Ganghwa fired on a Japanese boat from the surveying gunship Un'yō in 1875. During the Japanese Battle of Ganghwa, Un'yō captain Inoue Yoshika silenced the batteries with superior firepower and landed a raiding force which plundered local communities. The Imperial Japanese Navy blockaded the area and compelled the 1876 Treaty of Ganghwa, which opened Korea to Japanese commerce.

1871 invasion by U.S. warships

In 1866, the General Sherman arrived at Pyongyang via the Daedong River. A Welsh pastor, Thomas, was a crewman traveling for missionary work to Joseon. Pyongyang governor Park Gyu-su, Park Ji-won's grandson, informed the crew about his refusal to allow trade and advised them to go back. Disputes worsened among the crew; after they kidnapped a Joseon official and held him hostage, Korean authorities sank the boat and killed the surviving crew.

In 1871, during the Joseon expedition, the U.S. decided to open a port. It ordered the Joseon expedition to Asia, led by Fleet Commander Rogers. On June 1, The U.S. led sounding navigation of the Ganghwa Strait. When the fleet arrived in Sondolmok, it was attacked from the coastline by a Ganghwa artillery unit.

The American fleet seized the Chojijin Fort with naval gunfire. The American army took over Deokjjinjin Fort on June 11, and began the Gwangseongbo operation. After an hour of land and sea shelling, the American army captured Gwangseongbo. Three Americans were killed, and 10 wounded. Three hundred fifty Koreans were killed, and 20 wounded.

Therapeutic turnip
The island's turnip (Brassica rapa) has been cultivated for over a thousand years. Its moisture content is over 90 percent, and its main component is carbohydrate. The dark-purple, taproot vegetable has a mustardy scent and tastes like ginseng. The turnip's seeds and fully-grown vegetable are used in folk remedies and Oriental medicine. Its leaves have vitamins, and its roots contain tryptophan and glycyrrhizin. Said to have anticancer activity, the turnip helps cure skin diseases, digestive ailments, tuberculosis and respiratory disease with an anti-bacterial effect.

Festivals

Goryeo Azalea Festival: Mid-April at Dolmen Square on Goryeo Mountain
Ganghwa Salted Shrimp Festival: Early October at Oepo-ri dock
Ganghwa Foundation Day Grand Festival: October 1–3 in Chamseongdan on Manisan

Tourist attractions

Notable people
 CoreJJ, birth name Jo Yong-in, professional League of Legends player

See also

Geography of South Korea

References

Citations

 Ganghwa Tourism

Bibliography
 .

Ganghwa County
Islands of Incheon